Chadakolob is a rural locality (a selo) and the administrative center of Chadakolobsky Selsoviet, Tlyaratinsky District, Republic of Dagestan, Russia. The population was 228 as of 2010.

Geography 
Chadakolob is located 20 km north of Tlyarata (the district's administrative centre) by road. Chododa and Katroso are the nearest rural localities.

References 

Rural localities in Tlyaratinsky District